Wyoming Highway 35 (WYO 35) is a short  north–south Wyoming state highway located in northwestern Big Horn County in Cowley.

Route description
Wyoming Highway 35 is a spur route from U.S. Route 310/Wyoming Highway 789 (W. Main Street) in Cowley that heads south into some ranching areas southwest of Cowley. The WYO 35 designation ends at 1.08 miles as the roadway crosses railroad tracks and becomes Big Horn County Road R7 near the intersections of Road 5 and Road 7.
Big Horn CR 5 continues south to Byron, and Road 7 continues southeast back to US 310/WYO 789 near Lovell.

Major intersections

References

 Official 2003 State Highway Map of Wyoming

External links

 Wyoming State Routes 000-099
 WYO 35 - US-310/WYO 789 to Big Horn CR R7

Transportation in Big Horn County, Wyoming
035